Major Hashem al-Atta was a Sudanese political and military figure. Whilst he initially served in the National Revolutionary Command Council under Nimeiry, he is best known for his involvement in the 1971 coup d'état attempt, in which he, and other pro-communist members of the Sudanese Armed Forces attempted to overthrow Nimeiry and seize power. Initially successful, after several days the Revolutionary Government collapsed when Nimeiry was freed by loyalist military units. Following the failed coup attempt Atta and the other ringleaders were executed.

Early life and education
Atta was born on 12 March 1936 in Omdurman in what was then Anglo-Egyptian Sudan. He went on to graduate from high school in 1957, and immediately joined the Sudanese Air Force, graduating from the Air Force Academy as a Second Lieutenant in 1959.

Military career
He then proceeded to study in the United Kingdom from 1962 to 1963, in West Germany from 1963 to 1964, and in the United Arab Republic and United States in 1965.

Atta then went on to serve in the Sudanese Action Central Command from 1959 to 1963, before serving as a teacher at the Sudanese Infantry School from 1963 to 1965. Following this he served with the Sudanese Army's Southern Command from 1966 to 1968, before going on to serve as a Military Attache from 1968 to 1969 at the Sudanese Embassy in Bonn, then the capital of West Germany.

Following the 1969 coup d'état which brought Nimeiry to power Atta became a member of the ruling National Revolutionary Command Council. Atta served in several posts, including as Assistant Prime Minister (with a portfolio focusing on agriculture) before being arrested and removed from all posts on 16 November 1970.

Coup attempt

Atta achieved prominence in July 1971, leading a leftist coup in Khartoum on 19 July against Nimeiry's government. The coup was initially successful and Atta became the new Commander in Chief of the Armed Forces, Vice President, and Minister of Defense in the new Revolutionary Command Council. The new government was however beset by infighting.

On 23 July Nimeiry loyalists freed Nimeiry and returned him to power. Atta was summarily court-martialled and sentenced to death alongside the coup's other leaders, and was executed later the same day by firing squad.

References

1936 births
1971 deaths
Executed communists
People from Omdurman
Sudanese communists
Sudanese military personnel
People executed by Sudan by firing squad
Sudanese Communist Party politicians